Quercus helferiana is a species of tree in the beech family Fagaceae. It is native to Vietnam, Thailand, Laos, Myanmar, India (northeast), and southern China (Yunnan, Guangdong, Guangxi, Guizhou). It is placed in subgenus Cerris, section Cyclobalanopsis.

Description
Quercus helferiana is a tree up to 20 m. tall, with a trunk up to 0.3 m in diameter. Leaves oblong-elliptic, to elliptic-lanceolate, 120-150 (up to 220) × 40-80 (up to 95) mm, with wavy edges but no teeth or lobes.  The acorn is oblate, 10-16 × 15–22 mm, grey, with a depressed apex and often covered with shaggy hairs; the scar is 12–14 mm in diameter, flat to concave at maturity. Flowering is in March–April, acorns found from October–November.

References

helferiana
Flora of China
Flora of Assam (region)
Flora of Indo-China
Plants described in 1864